is a railway station of the Chūō Main Line, East Japan Railway Company (JR East) in Kamikanogawa, in the city of Yamanashi, Yamanashi Prefecture, Japan.

Lines
Yamanashishi Station is served by the Chūō Main Line, and is 122.2  kilometers from the terminus of the line at Tokyo Station.

Station layout
The station consists of one side platform and one island platform serving three tracks. The platforms are connected by a footbridge. The station is staffed.

Platforms

History 
The JGR became the JNR (Japanese National Railways) after the end of World War II. The station was renamed to its present name on January 15, 1962. Scheduled freight services were discontinued from November 15, 1982. With the dissolution and privatization of the JNR on April 1, 1987, the station came under the control of the East Japan Railway Company. Automated turnstiles using the Suica IC Card system came into operation from October 16, 2004.

Passenger statistics
In fiscal 2017, the station was used by an average of 1788 passengers daily (boarding passengers only).

Buses

Surrounding area
Yamanashi High School
Fuefuki River

See also
 List of railway stations in Japan

References

 Miyoshi Kozo. Chuo-sen Machi to eki Hyaku-niju nen. JT Publishing (2009)

External links

JR East Yamanashishi Station

Railway stations in Yamanashi Prefecture
Railway stations in Japan opened in 1903
Chūō Main Line
Stations of East Japan Railway Company
Yamanashi, Yamanashi